The Turkish music charts have been issued by Nielsen Music control and Radiomonitor. There is no singles chart issued based on single sales, since Turkey has an album-oriented market. Album sales are announced by Mü-yap, but Mü-yap does not announce weekly album charts.

There were three single charts derived from the main chart and issued by Billboard Türkiye magazine that are considered official:

Türkçe Top 20 - lists only Turkish language songs (published by Nielsen Music Control)
Türkiye Top 20 - lists only foreign songs (published by Billboard Türkiye), although it was shut down in 2010.
Turkish Rock Top 20 Chart, lists Turkish language rock songs and is published by Billboard Türkiye.

The current single chart is published by Radiomonitor Türkiye. Billboard has also continued to publish Turkey Songs chart, which exclusively list trending Turkish-language songs weekly.

See also 
 Billboard Türkiye
 Radiomonitor Türkiye
 Music of Turkey

References

External links 
 Mu-yap website (IFPI Local record industry association)
 Nielsen Music Control